Cephalaralia is a genus of epiphytic vines of the family Araliaceae, endemic to Australia. It is monotypic, being represented by the single species Cephalaralia cephalobotrys.

References 

Araliaceae
Monotypic Apiales genera
Endemic flora of Australia
Taxa named by Hermann Harms